The National Institutes of Design (NIDs) are a group of autonomous public design universities in India, with the primary institute, founded in 1961, in Ahmedabad, with extension campuses in Gandhinagar and Bengaluru. The other NIDs are located in the cities of Kurukshetra, Vijayawada, Jorhat and Bhopal. The NIDs function autonomously under the Department for Promotion of Industry and Internal Trade (DPIIT), Ministry of Commerce and Industry, Government of India. The NIDs are recognised by the Department of Scientific and Industrial Research of the government's Ministry of Science and Technology as a scientific and industrial research organisation. The universities are accorded Institutes of National Importance under the National Institute of Design Act, 2014.

Institutes 
The primary institute is located in Ahmedabad with extension campuses in Gandhinagar and Bengaluru. The creation of four additional NIDs was suggested as part of the central government's 2007 National Design Policy.

Admissions 
The NID Design Aptitude Test (NID-DAT) is a two-stage national-level entrance examination for the NIDs, organised every year by the NID Admissions Cell for admissions to undergraduate and post-graduate courses in the universities. The first stage of the examination is NID-DAT Prelims, which is a pen-and-paper design and general aptitude test, and the second stage is NID-DAT Mains, which is usually an in-studio design test and may also include a personal interview and portfolio review. The tests aim to evaluate the candidate's visualisation skills, creative & observation skills, knowledge, comprehension, analytical ability, et cetera.

Academics 
The courses available at NID span a wide range of disciplines (like graphic design, product design, interior design, filmmaking, animation, etc.) and include Bachelor of Design (B.Des.), Graduate Diploma Program in Design (GDPD), Master of Design (M.Des.) and doctoral programs (PhD). Several international programs and foundation courses are also available.

See also 

 T-Works
 IIT Bombay IDC School of Design

References

Sources
Health Care Innovation Takes the Stage at ACC.15

External links 

 
Film schools in India
Design schools in India
1961 establishments in India
Educational institutions established in 1961